The Modern Tribe is the second studio album from Baltimore's Celebration, released in 2007 by 4AD.

Critical reception
Spin wrote that "the insistent grooves lack dynamic drama, the instrumentation is overcooked, and [Katrina] Ford’s vocals often feel contrived." Exclaim! stated that "the TVOTR comparisons won't stop anytime soon but Celebration can rest assured they've set themselves apart with this sumptuous effort."

Track listing
 "Evergreen"  – 3:42
 "Pressure"  – 5:29
 "Heartbreak"  – 4:39
 "Pony"  – 3:38
 "Fly the Fly" – 3:44
 "Tame the Savage"  – 4:29
 "Hands Off My Gold"  – 3:21
 "In This Land"  – 4:02
 "Landmines"
 "Comets"  – 4:08
 "Wildcats"  – 3:09
 "Our Hearts Don't Change" - 3:57

Personnel
Sean Antanaitis - keyboards
David Bergander - drums
Katrina Ford - vocals

References

2007 albums
4AD albums
Albums produced by Dave Sitek